Rainberry may refer to:
Rainberry, Inc., company that owns μTorrent
"Rainberry" (song), 2018 song by Zayn on Icarus Falls